Irimbo is a municipality located in the southeastern part of the Mexican state of Michoacán. The municipality has an area of 125.54 square kilometers. 

The seat of the municipality is also named Irimbo.

As of 2010, it has a population of 14,766.

List of towns
 Irimbo
 San Lorenzo Queréndaro
 San José de Magallanes
 San Francisco Epunguio
 La Frontera
 Colonia el Colorín
 Los Marzos
 Loma de Chupio
 La Cuajada
 San Miguel la Virgen
 Ampliación las Joyas
 Cristo Rey
 Los Mogotes
 Hacienda Jaripeo
 Colonia los Cedros
 Cerrito Blanco
 Balvaneda
 Llano Grande
 Los Hoyos
 San Miguel el Alto
 Los Marzos Pequeña
 Fraccionamiento el Obraje
 Concharrás
 Tzintzingareo
 Manzana de San Vicente

References

Municipalities of Michoacán